Luiz Carlos Vieira Junior (born July 27, 1982) is a Brazilian footballer who plays as a midfielder for São Luiz.

References

External links

Living people
1982 births
Brazilian footballers
Association football midfielders
Expatriate footballers in Hong Kong
Brazilian expatriate sportspeople in Hong Kong
Hong Kong Premier League players
South China AA players